Liberty Way is a multi-use sports stadium in Nuneaton, Warwickshire, England, which is leased by Nuneaton Town F.C. but is also used by Nuneaton R.F.C., which rents the stadium from the football club. Liberty Way has been used by the rugby club since the 1990s; however, it was a mere pitch with a perimeter fence and nothing like the facilities of the current complex.
The current stadium is made up of 4 stands.

Opening 

Nuneaton Borough moved into the stadium prior to the start of the 2007–08 season, and their first match at the stadium was played on Tuesday 17 July 2007, when local rivals Coventry City visited for a 2–2 draw. The first ever goal at the stadium was scored by a Brazilian trialist playing for Coventry City, whilst the first Boro player to score was defender Gavin Cowan. The stadium also played host to the Coventry Jets American football team, who beat rivals Bristol Aztecs 13–7 in the BAFL Premier Division semi final, August 2007.

Stadium 
The stadium has 4 stands

Britannia Tyres Stand which can hold 1,800 supporters.

Away Stand (Loans 2 Go Stand), which can hold 1,000 visiting supporters.

Rugby Club Terrace (South Terrace) which is the only uncovered part of the stadium holds up to 500 standing.

Main Stand has 500 seats.

There is also a small complex of club offices, Sports Bar (Legends Lounge) between the Britannia Tyres Stand and the Main Stand. The ground also meets the ground grading criteria for the National League

Geography 

Liberty Way is part of the Attleborough Fields Industrial Estate and therefore the stadium is surrounded by warehouses and factories. There is a sizeable car park at the stadium, as well as other pitches for football and rugby. Nuneaton R.F.C. use one of the outfield pitches for their home games when Nuneaton Town play at the stadium

Re-naming the stadium
In 2014, the stadium was renamed as the JDRF James Parnell Stadium to promote juvenile diabetes and to promote the JDRF Foundation. On 23 July 2015 it was renamed the A1 Gasforce Stadium. For the 2016 to 2017 season, it was renamed as the Coombe Abbey Arena. For the 2017 to 2018 season, the stadium was renamed as the LDJ Solicitors Stadium.

References

Sports venues in Warwickshire
Football venues in England
Sports venues in Nuneaton
Rugby union stadiums in England
Nuneaton Borough F.C.